550 Park Avenue is a luxury apartment building on Park Avenue on the Upper East Side of Manhattan, New York City, United States.

Design
550 Park Avenue was designed by J.E.R. Carpenter. The 17-floor building was completed on December 11, 1917 and converted to a cooperative in 1952 with only 32 apartments. It is adjacent to the Browning School.

Notable residents
Carpenter and his wife were among the initial residents.
August Belmont, Jr., a financier
Hulda Lashanska, a soprano singer
Diana Vreeland, a fashion columnist and editor

References

External links
550 PARK AVENUE, 16AE

Apartment buildings in New York City
Residential buildings in Manhattan
Condominiums and housing cooperatives in Manhattan
Park Avenue
Upper East Side